Several vessels operating around 1800 were named Admiral Kingsmill for Sir Robert Kingsmill, 1st Baronet, the first Commander-in-Chief (1797–1800) of the British Royal Navy's Cork Station.
  first appeared in Lloyd's Register in 1796, and last appeared in 1800. In between, she was briefly a privateer and then made one voyage as a slave ship.
  was launched in Spain. She first appeared in Lloyd's Register The French privateer  captured her in April 1799.

See also
 

Merchant ships of the United Kingdom
Age of Sail merchant ships
Ship names